Zamboanga (also Zamboaŋga) was a province of the Philippines located in the western region of the southern island of Mindanao, Philippines.

History

Creation
During the time of the United States' purchase of the Philippines (1898), the Republic of Zamboanga had its own independence and jurisdiction on what is now Zamboanga City. After the dissolution of the republic, Zamboanga was eventually consolidated into one major administrative area by the American government of the Philippines, consisting of an enormous region that was the Mindanao island's western peninsula, Basilan Island, and the entire Sulu archipelago, with the ancient namesake town/fort of Zamboanga as the seat of its government, and was called the Moro Province of the Philippines.

The Moro Province, in 1914 was replaced by the Department of Mindanao and Sulu. It was divided into Zamboanga, Sulu, Cotabato, Davao, Agusan and Surigao. The town of Zamboanga as its capital. Luis Lim was appointed as the first governor of Zamboanga.

In 1920, the Department of Mindanao and Sulu was officially dissolved and Zamboanga became an independent province. In 1922, elections were held for the first elected provincial officials of Zamboanga. Florentino Saguin was elected as first elected governor.

At that time, the province was composed of five municipalities:
Dipolog
Dapitan
Lubungan
Isabela
Zamboanga

Zamboanga was also sub-divided into 12 municipal districts:
Bangaan
Dinas
Kabasalan
Kumalarang
Lamitan
Maluso
Margosatubig
Panganuran
Sibuko
Sindangan
Sirawai
Taluksangay

World War II
When the Japanese invaded the Philippines, Zamboanga acting Governor Felipe Azcuna moved the capital from Zamboanga City to Dipolog. After the defeat of the American-Filipino forces in Corregidor, most of the province went under Japanese control.

After the war, on June 16, 1948, Molave was designated as Zamboanga's capital by the virtue of Republic Act No. 286 signed by President Elpidio Quirino.

Division
On June 6, 1952, the Republic Act 711, authored by Zamboanga Congressman Roseller Lim was passed by the Philippine House of Representatives to divide the province of Zamboanga to Zamboanga del Norte and Zamboanga del Sur, while the chartered City of Zamboanga and Basilan became part of Zamboanga del Sur . The bill was signed by President Elpidio Quirino in a ceremony held at the Malacañan Palace.

The towns of Dapitan, Dipolog, Rizal, New Piñan, Polanco, Katipunan, Manukan, Sindangan, Liloy, Labason and Siocon are composed of the province of Zamboanga del Norte. The City of Zamboanga & Island of Basilan and towns of Molave, Pagadian, Labangan, Margosatubig, Dimataling, Dinas, Ipil, Buug, Malangas, Kabasalan and Aurora are under Zamboanga del Sur.

The town of Dipolog was designated capital of Zamboanga del Norte and the town of Pagadian as Zamboanga del Sur's capital.

In 2001, a brand new Zamboanga province, Zamboanga Sibugay, was created from the province of Zamboanga del Sur with Ipil as its provincial capital.

Governors

Timeline

Post-War Period
 1970 – Local Government troops invaded Zamboanga and cleared the fields against the Islamic rebels of the Moro National Liberation Front (MNLF) that began the Islamic Insurgencies.
 September 21, 1972 – Then President Ferdinand E. Marcos declared Martial Law in the Philippines.
 November 14, 1984 – Then Zamboanga City Mayor Cesar Climaco was assassinated and shot dead in downtown Zamboanga City.
 February 22–25, 1986 – EDSA People Power Revolution. Corazon A. Aquino was the first woman president and 11th President of the Philippines when she was declared as the winner of the 1986 presidential election after the EDSA People Power Revolution.
 January 5, 1989 – Camp Cawa-Cawa siege in Zamboanga City; government forces assaulted the camp where Gen. Eduardo Batalla and Col. Romeo Abendan of the Philippine Constabulary were being held hostage by rogue Muslim policemen led by Rizal Alih.

See also
Legislative district of Zamboanga
Provinces of the Philippines

References

Former provinces of the Philippines
1914 establishments in the Philippines
1952 disestablishments in the Philippines
History of Zamboanga del Norte
History of Zamboanga del Sur
History of Zamboanga Sibugay
History of Basilan
History of Sulu
History of Tawi-Tawi